Darell Tokpa (born 2 June 2001) is a French professional footballer who plays as a forward for Luxembourgisch club Differdange 03 on loan from Amiens.

Club career
Tokpa made his professional debut with Amiens SC in 1–1 Ligue 2 tie with Clermont on 21 November 2020.

On 12 July 2022, Tokpa moved on a season-long loan to Stade Briochin. On 1 February 2023, he moved on a new loan to Differdange 03 in Luxembourg.

International career
Born in France, Tokpa is of Ivorian, Guadeloupean and Martiniquais descent. He is a youth international for France.

References

External links
 

2001 births
Living people
Sportspeople from Colombes
French people of Martiniquais descent
French people of Guadeloupean descent
French sportspeople of Ivorian descent
French footballers
Association football forwards
France youth international footballers
Amiens SC players
Red Star F.C. players
Stade Briochin players
FC Differdange 03 players
Ligue 2 players
Championnat National players
Championnat National 3 players
French expatriate footballers
Expatriate footballers in Luxembourg
French expatriate sportspeople in Luxembourg